Sídlisko KVP is a borough (city ward) in the city of Košice, Slovakia, in the Košice II district.

The name "KVP" stands for "Košický vládny program" ("Košice Government Program").

History 

The borough was founded in 1980, along with the new housing estates being built here at the time. Large-scale construction of the borough lasted until 1989.

Statistics
 Area: 
 Population: 23,864 (December 2017)
 Population density: 13,000/km2 (December 2017)
 District: Košice II
 Mayor: Ladislav Lörinc (as of 2018 elections)

Gallery

References

External links

 Official website of the Sídlisko KVP borough
 Article on the Sídlisko KVP borough at Cassovia.sk
 Official website of Košice

Boroughs of Košice